Anzomyia is a genus of flies in the family Tabanidae.

Species
Anzomyia anomala (Mackerras, 1960)
Anzomyia chrysomallis Lessard, 2012
Anzomyia herculensis Lessard, 2012
Anzomyia pegasus Lessard, 2012

References

Tabanidae
Brachycera genera
Diptera of Australasia